Teemu Nurmi (born 24 February 1985) is a Finnish ice hockey player currently playing for Lukko of the Finnish Liiga.

References

External links

Living people
Lukko players
1985 births
Finnish ice hockey forwards
Tappara players
Espoo Blues players
Ice hockey people from Tampere